The gray-backed sportive lemur (Lepilemur dorsalis), also known as Gray's sportive lemur or back-striped sportive lemur, is a species of lemur in the family Lepilemuridae. It is endemic to Madagascar. It is threatened by habitat loss.

References

Sportive lemurs
Mammals described in 1870
Taxa named by John Edward Gray
Taxonomy articles created by Polbot